See Also: Dukes of Holstein-Gottorp
The Duchesses of Holstein-Gottorp were the consorts of the rulers of Holstein-Gottorp.

Duchess consort of Schleswig and Holstein in Gottorp, 1544–1713

Duchess consort of Holstein-Gottorp, since 1713

Duchess consort of Oldenburg-Schleswig-Holstein-Gottorp, 1773–1829

Notes

See also 
 Dukes of Holstein-Gottorp
 List of consorts of Schleswig and Holstein
 List of consorts of Holstein-Sonderborg
 List of Russian consorts
 List of Danish consorts
 List of consorts of Oldenburg
 List of Norwegian queens
 List of Finnish consorts
 List of Swedish consorts 
 
People from the Duchy of Holstein
 
Holstein-Gottorp, Consort of